Ryan Lawler (born April 9, 1987) is an American former stock car racing driver. Lawler competed in 8 races in the 2008 NASCAR Craftsman Truck Series. His best finish was 17th, which he achieved at Martinsville and Kentucky. Lawler finished 35th in the point standings.

Motorsports career results

NASCAR
(key) (Bold – Pole position awarded by qualifying time. Italics – Pole position earned by points standings or practice time. * – Most laps led.)

Craftsman Truck Series

ARCA Re/Max Series
(key) (Bold – Pole position awarded by qualifying time. Italics – Pole position earned by points standings or practice time. * – Most laps led.)

References

External links
 

Living people
1987 births
NASCAR drivers
NASCAR people
ARCA Menards Series drivers
People from Colleyville, Texas
Racing drivers from Fort Worth, Texas
Racing drivers from Texas